Ernesto Aguirre (born 10 September 1963) is a Peruvian footballer. He played in four matches for the Peru national football team in 1991. He was also part of Peru's squad for the 1991 Copa América tournament.

References

External links
 

1963 births
Living people
Peruvian footballers
Peru international footballers
Place of birth missing (living people)
Association football forwards
Deportivo Municipal managers